P.S. 135 (Public School 135), also known as P.S. 35 (Public School 35), is a historic school building located at 931 First Avenue at East 51st Street in the Turtle Bay neighborhood of Manhattan, New York City. It was built in 1892 on the site of "Mount Pleasant", the estate of James Beekman.  The school was designed by George W. Debevoise in the Romanesque revival style., and has been at various times a community center, a homeless shelter and a nursery school, as well as the United Nations International School. There was an addition made to the building in 1904.

The building was added to the National Register of Historic Places in 1980.  A condominium tower was built inside the facade of the building in 2000.

See also
Facadism
National Register of Historic Places listings in Manhattan from 14th to 59th Streets

References
Notes

External links

School buildings on the National Register of Historic Places in Manhattan
School buildings completed in 1890
Romanesque Revival architecture in New York City
Turtle Bay, Manhattan